Rob Vilain is a Dutch curler from the Curling Club PWA. He has curled in 10 European Curling Championships. He has only skipped in one though, that being the 2001 championships where he finished in 16th place. He has also been in the 1994 World Championships, when he was a second for Wim Neeleman. They finished in 7th place.

Teams

Men's

Mixed

References

External links

Living people
Dutch male curlers
Dutch curling coaches
Year of birth missing (living people)